The 1859 New Jersey gubernatorial election was held on November 8, 1859. Opposition Party nominee Charles Smith Olden defeated Democratic nominee Edwin R. V. Wright with 50.76% of the vote.

Democratic nomination

Candidates
Thomas H. Herring, State Senator from Bergen County and President of the New Jersey Senate
Joseph E. Potts, former State Senator from Atlantic County
Charles Sitgreaves, former State Senator from Warren County
Charles Skelton, former U.S. Representative from Trenton
Garrett Sykes
Alexander Wertz
Edwin R.V. Wright, former Mayor of Hudson City and Hudson County prosecutor

Convention
The Democratic Party held a convention in Trenton on August 24. Entering the convention, the leading candidates were Edwin R.V. Wright, Charles Skelton, Alexander Wertz, and Garrett Sykes.

At the start of the convention, there were many disputes between delegations over the Lecompton Constitution; Lecomptonites outnumbered opponents four-to-one. A lengthy dispute between rival delegations from Sussex, split over the Lecompton question, resulted in neither delegation being seated.

Names were placed in nomination for Governor, including Wright, Skelton, Wertz, Sykes, joined by Charles Sitgreaves, Joseph Potts, and Thomas H. Herring. Before balloting began, the Party adopted a platform embracing the Buchanan administration and opposing any attempt by Congress to regulate slavery in the territories. The party also denounced any attempt to revive the Atlantic slave trade.

Balloting commenced, with Wright taking a strong plurality on the first ballot and extending his lead on the second. After the Sussex delegates failed to reach an agreement, there was a motion to exclude their votes entirely, causing a lengthy delay as the convention recessed.

After the convention was recalled to order, balloting restarted, Wright maintaining his large plurality. Herring's name was also withdrawn. On the fifth ballot, it became clear Wright had a majority. Many delegations switched their votes to make his nomination unanimous.

Wright was notified of his victory and appeared at the convention to make an acceptance speech.

Opposition nomination

Candidates
Andrew K. Hay, businessman and former Whig U.S. Representative from Winslow Township
William K. McDonald
Ephraim Marsh, former State Senator from Morris County
Charles Smith Olden, former Whig State Senator from Mercer County
Joseph W. Porter

Withdrew at convention
Joseph W. Allen, former State Senator from Burlington County (before balloting)
Dudley S. Gregory, former Whig U.S. Representative and Mayor of Jersey City (during first ballot)
Edward Y. Rogers, former State Senator from Middlesex County (after second ballot)

Convention
Once again, elements opposed to the incumbent Democratic administration in Washington joined together to present a candidate for Governor. Upon a public call by opposition legislators, they met at Temperance Hall in Trenton on September 7. The plurality of the convention were Know-Nothings, joined by a large number of Republicans and a significant minority of Democrats opposed to the Lecompton Constitution.

Charles Smith Olden, Joseph W. Allen, Joseph W. Porter, Andrew K. Hay, William K. McDonald, Ephraim Marsh, Edward Y. Rogers, and Dudley S. Gregory were nominated. Before balloting began, Allen's name was withdrawn. On the first ballot, Smith led. Gregory's name was withdrawn by his request. After the second ballot, Olden led by a larger margin and Rogers's name was withdrawn. A motion was made to nominate Olden by acclamation, but it was shouted down. On the third ballot, Olden received a majority, and his nomination was made unanimous by acclamation.

Some hesitation ensued after a delegate announced that the American convention, meeting elsewhere in Trenton, had nominated Peter Clarke, thus splitting the opposition. However, word soon came that the Americans had nominated Olden as well, and the convention concluded with speeches made in favor of the candidate.

The convention adopted a moderate platform that was nearly silent on the issue of slavery, except that it opposed any effort to revive the Atlantic slave trade. It endorsed a protective tariff and denounced the Buchanan administration as corrupt, extravagant, and oppressive of free speech and thought.

American Party convention
The American Party met simultaneous to the Opposition convention at the Trenton Atheneum. During the first ballot for Governor, word arrived that the Opposition convention had nominated Olden. On the first ballot, the Americans nominated Olden by 96 votes against 35 for Peter J. Clarke.

General election

Candidates
Charles Smith Olden, former State Senator from Mercer County (Opposition and American)
Edwin R. V. Wright, former Mayor of Hudson City and Hudson County prosecutor (Democratic)

Results

Notes

References

1859
New Jersey
1859 New Jersey elections
November 1859 events